The Bell P-76 was the proposed designation for a production model derivative of the XP-39E, a single-engine American fighter aircraft prototype of World War II.

Design and development
On 26 February 1941 the United States Army Air Corps (USAAC) placed a contract with Bell allowing for the purchase of two XP-39Es (41-19501 and 41-19502) which were envisaged to be a major improvement on the P-39D series. Because of the number of changes proposed the production model was to be called the Bell P-76.

The Bell P-76 was proposed to address the poor high-altitude performance of the P-39 Airacobra by incorporating a new and thicker wing with a symmetrical airfoil; the section chosen was NACA 0018 at the wing-root tapering to an NACA 23009 at the tip. Although the new wing has often been referred to as a laminar flow type, this was not the case. The wing span was increased to 35 ft 10 in (10.9 m) and the area to 236 ft² (21.9 m²), the thicker wing allowing an increase in the fuel capacity to 150 US gallons (568 L).

Design of a new Allison V-1710-E9 was also underway. This version, which had the military designation of V-1710-47, used a two-stage mechanical supercharger to increase the engine power at altitude. However, this engine went through so many design changes that it ended up being almost identical to the later V-1710-93 which was fitted in the XP-63A.

Another change was the engine bay was modified to accept a more powerful engine in lieu of the V-1710. Its origins lie in the 1941 project to equip three P-39D (41-19501, 41-19502 and 42-7164) with the Continental V-1430-1 liquid-cooled supercharged engine. The resultant XP-39E had a symmetrical airfoil wing with square wingtips, an elongated fuselage to accommodate the larger engine, and revised air intakes and radiators. The three prototypes each had a different tailfin. Since the Continental engine was not available at rollout, the prototypes flew with Allison V-1710-47 engines. In 1942, the XP-39E was redesignated P-76. Although 4,000 aircraft were initially ordered, the order was cancelled to permit the Bell factory to manufacture B-29 Superfortress bomber aircraft under license from Boeing. Many of the lessons learned in the P-76 were implemented in the subsequent P-63 Kingcobra.

Specifications (P-76)

See also

References

Citations

Bibliography

 Bowers, Peter M. "Airborne Cobra Pt.II". Airpower magazine, Vol.9, No.1, January 1979.

Bell XP-46
P-076
Mid-engined aircraft
Single-engined tractor aircraft
Low-wing aircraft